The Serpent's Gold is a compilation album by British doom metal band Cathedral, released on 21 June 2004 through Earache. It consists of two discs, featuring a "Best of" titled "The Serpent's Treasure" and a collection of demos and rarities titled "The Serpent's Chest".

Release
Earache released the album in the United Kingdom on 21 June 2004 and in the United States on 27 July 2004. The booklet contains an interview with singer Lee Dorrian and a track-by-track interview about the songs on the second disc with guitarist Garry Jennings.

Track listing

Personnel

Cathedral
 Lee Dorrian – vocals, compilation
 Garry Jennings – bass (disc 1: 1, 4, 6, 15, disc 2: 1–3, 5, 8, 10, 11), guitar, drums (disc 2: 10), keyboard (disc 2: 4, 9), backing vocals (disc 2: 9), tambourine (disc 1: 3, 5), compilation
 Brian Dixon – drums (disc 1: 2, 7, 9, 11, 13, 14, disc 2: 8, 11)
 Scott Carlson – bass (disc 2: 4, 6, 9)
 Adam Lehan – bass (disc 2: 7), guitar (disc 1: 1, 3–6, 9, 10, 12, 15, disc 2: 1–3, 5, 7, 12)
 Mark Griffiths – bass (disc 1: 3, 5, 10, 12, disc 2: 2, 12)
 Mark Ramsey Wharton – drums (disc 1: 1, 3–6, 9, 15, disc 2: 1, 2, 5, 7), Hammond organ (disc 1: 3, 5), penny whistle (disc 2: 1), flute (disc 2: 5)
 Leo Smee – bass (disc 1: 2, 7, 8, 11, 13, 14, disc 2: 8, 11)
 Ben Mochrie – drums (disc 2: 2, 12)

Live musicians
 Victor Griffin – guitar (disc 2: 6)
 Joe Hasselvander – drums (disc 2: 6)
 Dave Hornyak – drums (disc 2: 4, 9)

Technical personnel
 Matthew Vickerstaff – design, layout
 Dave Patchett – cover artwork
 Olivier Badin – liner notes
 John Paul – mastering
 Dan Tobin – compilation

References

Cathedral (band) albums
2004 compilation albums